Sydney Goodsir Smith (26 October 1915 – 15 January 1975) was a New Zealand-born Scottish poet, artist, dramatist and novelist. He wrote poetry in literary Scots often referred to as Lallans (Lowlands dialect), and was a major figure of the Scottish Renaissance.

Life

He was born in Wellington, New Zealand, the son of Catherine Goodsir Gelenick and Sydney Smith, a pioneer in forensic science who later became a Regius Professor in forensic medicine at the University of Edinburgh.

He moved to Edinburgh with his family in 1928. He was educated at Malvern College. He went to the University of Edinburgh to study medicine, but abandoned that, and started to study history at Oriel College, Oxford; whence he was expelled, but managed to complete a degree. He also claimed to have studied art in Italy, wine in France and mountains in Bavaria.

In the late 1930s, Smith was introduced to the works of Hugh MacDiarmid by Hector MacIver, a literary critic who taught English at Edinburgh's Royal High School.  In a letter dated 1 November 1941 he informed MacDiarmid that he 'gave up writing English for Scots' after reading A Drunk Man Looks at the Thistle (1926).

His first poetry collection, Skail Wind, was published in 1941. Carotid Cornucopius (1947) was a comic novel about Edinburgh. Under the Eildon Tree (1948), a long poem in 24 parts, is considered by many his finest work; The Grace of God and the Meth-Drinker is a much-anthologised poem.  His A Short Introduction to Scottish Literature, based on four broadcast talks, was published in 1951. His play The Wallace formed part of the 1960 Edinburgh Festival. Kynd Kittock's Land (1964) was a poem commissioned by the BBC for television broadcast. Other works broadcast by the BBC as dramas or poetic dialogues include The Death of Tristram and Iseult (1947), The Vision of the Prodigal Son (1959), The Stick Up or Full Circle (1961), The Twa Brigs (1964), A Night at Ambrose's (1972), Macallister (1973), and Gowdspink in Reekie (1976).  Unpublished works include Bottled Peaches, a novel which draws on his life as a student in Oxford, and The Merrie Life and Dowie Death of Colickie Meg, a dramatic adaptation and continuation of Carotid Cornucopius.

As a young man, Smith's ambition was to be an artist. While travelling in Europe in 1936–37, he made drawings in Switzerland, Germany, Italy and France. In post-war Scotland he made sketches of contemporary subjects and drawings to illustrate his poems.  He also sketched and painted watercolours on trips to the Highlands with Denis Peploe and Sorley MacLean.  Drawings collected by the architect Ian Begg were published in a book edited by Joy Hendry in 1998. Smith was art critic of The Scotsman from 1960 to 1967.

Smith was a member of the Scottish Arts Club and was associated with the editorial board for the Lines Review magazine.

He died in the Royal Infirmary of Edinburgh after a heart attack outside a newsagents on Dundas Street in Edinburgh, and was buried in Dean Cemetery in the northern 20th century section, towards the north-west. His second wife, Hazel Williamson, lies with him.

Memorials

He is commemorated by a "pavement poem" in the "Makars' Court" a section of James Court off the Lawnmarket on the Royal Mile.

Works
Skail Wind - poems, Edinburgh, The Chalmers press, 1941
The Wanderer, and other poems, Edinburgh, Oliver and Boyd, 1943
The Deevil’s Waltz, Glasgow, W. MacLellan, 1946
Selected Poems, Edinburgh, published for The Saltire Society by Oliver and Boyd, 1947
A Short Introduction to Scottish Literature, Serif Books, 1951
So Late into the Night - fifty lyrics, 1944-1948, with a preface by Edith Sitwell, London, P. Russell, 1952
Orpheus and Eurydice - a dramatic poem, Edinburgh, M. Macdonald, 1955
Figs and Thistles, Edinburgh, Oliver and Boyd, 1959
The Wallace, a triumph in five acts, Edinburgh, Oliver and Boyd, 1960
The Vision of the Prodigal Son, M. Macdonald, 1960
Carotid Cornucopius, caird o the Cannon Gait and voyeur o the Outluik Touer, Edinburgh, M. Macdonald, 1964
Kynd Kittock’s Land, Edinburgh, M. Macdonald, 1965
Fifteen Poems and a Play, Edinburgh, Southside, 1969
Collected Poems, 1941-1975, with an introduction by Hugh MacDiarmid, London, John Calder, 1975
The Drawings of Sydney Goodsir Smith, poet, collected by Ian Begg, edited by Joy Hendry, Edinburgh, Chapman Press, on behalf of The New Auk Society, 1998
A Publisher of the Nineties (Leonard Smithers) in The Holiday Book. 1946 (Ed. by John Singer)
Gowdspink in Reekie, Little Brown and Co., 1974

As editor:

Robert Fergusson, 1750–1774: essays by various hands (Edinburgh: Nelson, 1952)
Gavin Douglas: a selection from his poetry (Edinburgh: Oliver & Boyd, 1959)
The Merry Muses of Caledonia, with James Barke and John DeLancey Ferguson (Edinburgh: M. Macdonald, 1959).
Hugh MacDiarmid: a Festschrift, with Kulgin Duval (Edinburgh: K.D. Duval, 1962)
A Choice of Burns’s Poems and Songs (London: Faber and Faber, 1966)

Reviews
 Campbell, Donald (1975), review of Gowdspink in Reekie, in Burnett, Ray (ed.), Calgacus 2, Summer 1975, pp. 54 & 55, 
 Burns, John (1983), review of Carotid Cornucopius, in Hearn, Sheila G. (ed), Cencrastus No. 14, Autumn 1983, pp. 50 & 51,

References

Further reading
McCaffery, Ritchie (ed.) (2019), Sydney Goodsir Smith, Poet: Essays on His Life and Work, Brill Rodopi,

External links
 A brief biography of Sydney Goodsir Smith.
 A list of his work at Scottish Poetry Library.
 Brief biography at the official website of Sorley Maclean.

1915 births
1975 deaths
Scots Makars
People educated at Malvern College
Alumni of Oriel College, Oxford
Lallans poets
Burials at the Dean Cemetery
People from Wellington City
Writers from Edinburgh
Alumni of the University of Edinburgh
Scottish artists
Scottish dramatists and playwrights
Scottish novelists
Scottish comedy writers
Scottish biographers
Scottish Renaissance
New Zealand poets
New Zealand male dramatists and playwrights
New Zealand artists
20th-century New Zealand dramatists and playwrights
New Zealand male novelists
New Zealand biographers
Male biographers
New Zealand emigrants to the United Kingdom
20th-century British novelists
20th-century British dramatists and playwrights
20th-century Scottish poets
Scottish male poets
20th-century biographers
British male dramatists and playwrights
20th-century British male writers
Claddagh Records artists